The Immaculate Conception Cathedral is a religious building belonging to the Roman Catholic Church and is located in the town of Pella in the region of Namakwa in the Northern Cape (Noord-Kaap) in South Africa, near the border with neighboring Namibia.

Stresses since it is the seat of the bishop of the diocese of Keimoes-Upington (Dioecesis Keimoesanus-Upingtonensis) which was created in 1951 by the bull Suprema Nobis of Pope Pius XII.

Work on its construction was completed in 1895, and follows the Roman or Latin rite.

See also
Roman Catholicism in South Africa

References

Roman Catholic cathedrals in South Africa
Roman Catholic churches completed in 1872
Buildings and structures in the Northern Cape
19th-century Roman Catholic church buildings in South Africa
Namakwa District Municipality
19th-century religious buildings and structures in South Africa